First Meeting is an album by Czech bassist Miroslav Vitouš recorded in 1979 and released on the ECM label.

Reception 
The Allmusic review by David R. Adler awarded the album 3 stars stating "Recommended but hard to find, First Meeting documents the strength of Vitouš' writing and playing ".

Track listing 
All compositions by Miroslav Vitouš except as indicated
 "Silver Lake" - 10:52 
 "Beautiful Place To" - 5:11 
 "Trees" - 6:10 
 "Recycle" - 10:10 
 "First Meeting" (Miroslav Vitouš, Kenny Kirkland, John Surman, Jon Christensen) - 4:48 
 "Concerto in Three Parts" - 5:32 
 "You Make Me So Happy" - 4:33 
Recorded at Talent Studio in Oslo, Norway in May 1979

Personnel 
 Miroslav Vitouš — double bass
 John Surman — soprano saxophone, bass clarinet 
 Kenny Kirkland — piano 
 Jon Christensen — drums

References 

ECM Records albums
Miroslav Vitouš albums
1980 albums
Albums produced by Manfred Eicher